'Ranjeet Deshmukh, who has served as the agriculture minister in the Vilasrao Deshmukh cabinet between 1999-2004, had also held other portfolios. He had held the position as state unit president of the party on two occasions was the  president of Maharashtra Pradesh Congress Committee (MPCC). He was first elected to the MLA in 1985 from the Savner constituency.

Political career 
'Ranjeet Deshmukh, joined politics in the 1970. He was a youth leader and the head of the youth congress of the  Indian National Congress who worked very closely with Sanjay Gandhi. He was first elected as an MLA from Ramtek constituency  Maharashtra. In the 1990s he was involved in the movement for a separate statehood for   Vidarbha. Ranjeet Deshmukh considered 'chief minister material' for Maharashtra. He was in the reckoning but party colleague Vilasrao Deshmukh got the post Later, he fell out with the Congress leadership over granting of statehood to Vidarbha. Ranjeet Deshmukh held several Cabinet portfolios right from rural development in which he made significant contribution pioneering village cleanliness drives, to education, technical education, health, agriculture and textiles. He was in the Congress-led governments in the state for almost two decades. He had love-hate relationship with former CM late Vilasrao Deshmukh. In 2004 he unsuccessfully contested from Nagpur West Assembly seat and was defeated by former Maharashtra CM Devendra Fadnavis of the BJP. He was a two-term president of Maharashtra Pradesh Congress Committee and ex-minister. Ranjit Deshmukh was seeking a desperate comeback into the Congress mainstream.
His 65th birthday celebrations provided an occasion. His old associates organized a function which looked more like a Congress event. The organizing committee of over 150 Congressmen was headed by district guardian minister Shivajirao Moghe and had two ministers from the city Nitin Raut and Rajendra Mulak. In 2014 he quit the Indian National Congress because of poor functioning" of the organisation.

Personal life
'Ranjeet Deshmukh is married to Mrs.Roopa Deshmukh and has 2 children  Ashish Deshmukh & Dr. Amol Deshmukh. His elder son Ashish Deshmukh was elected as an MLA in the 2014 Maharashtra Assembly Election . He represents the Katol Assembly Constituency. He belonged to the Bharatiya Janata Party 2014. His younger son Dr. Amol Deshmukh fought the 2014 Assembly Election on a Nationalist Congress Party ticket. In 2002 along with Chikki Panday  he founded the 'Akshara Foundation of Arts & Learning' which works towards providing education to under privileged children. In the year 1990 Ranjeet Deshmukh also  founded the NKP Salve Institute of Medical Sciences, now a leading name in private medical education

Positions held
Agriculture minister in the Government of Maharashtra 1999-2004 
Elected MLA Maharashtra Legislative Assembly  1985 from the Savner constituency
Two terms MPCC president Maharashtra Pradesh Congress Committee
Two terms MLC Maharashtra Legislative Council

References

Indian Hindus
Living people
Members of the Maharashtra Legislative Council
Politicians from Nagpur
State cabinet ministers of Maharashtra
Maharashtra MLAs 1999–2004
Indian National Congress politicians from Maharashtra
Marathi politicians
Year of birth missing (living people)